Green and Red Canaries was a Gran Canaria-based electoral alliance formed by United Canarian Left, Canaries for the Left–Yes We Can and Party for Services and Public Employed ahead of the 2011 general election. It contested the election in the province of Las Palmas.

Member parties
United Canarian Left (ICU)
Canaries for the Left–Yes We Can (CxIzq–SSP)
Party for Services and Public Employed (PSyEP)

References

Defunct political party alliances in Spain
Political parties in the Canary Islands
Political parties established in 2011
Political parties disestablished in 2011